Uporovsky District  is an administrative district (raion), one of the twenty-two in Tyumen Oblast, Russia. As a municipal division, it is incorporated as Uporovsky Municipal District. It is located in the southwest of the oblast. Its administrative center is the rural locality (a selo) of Uporovo. Population: 20,662 (2010 Census);  The population of Uporovo accounts for 28.3% of the district's total population.

See also 
 Ingala Valley

References

Sources 

Districts of Tyumen Oblast